HardBall! is a baseball video game published by Accolade. Initially released for the Commodore 64 in 1985, it was ported to other computers over the next several years. A Sega Genesis cartridge was published in 1991. HardBall! was followed by sequels HardBall II, HardBall III, HardBall IV, HardBall 5, and HardBall 6.

Gameplay
Play is controlled with a joystick or arrow keys and an action button. One of the four cardinal directions is used to choose the pitch, and again to aim it towards low, high, inside (towards batter), or outside (away from batter). The same directions are used to aim the swing when batting. When fielding after a hit, the defensive player closest to the ball will flash to show it is the one currently under control. The four directions are then used to throw to one of the four bases.

Hardball! was one of the first baseball video games to incorporate the perspective from the pitcher's mound, similar to MLB broadcasts.  There are also managerial options available. The player has a selection of pitchers to choose from. Each team member has his own statistics that affect his performance, and can be rearranged as desired. Prior to HardBall!s release, there were managerial baseball games available, such as MicroLeague Baseball but HardBall! was the first to integrate that aspect with the arcade control of the game action itself.

Reception

Hardball! was a commercial blockbuster. The Commodore 64 topped the UK sales chart in March 1986. It went on to become Accolade's best-selling Commodore game as of late 1987, and by 1989 had surpassed 500,000 units sold.

Info rated Hardball! four-plus stars out of five, stating that it "is easily the best baseball simulation we have seen to date for the 64/128" and praising its graphics. ANALOG Computing praised the Atari 8-bit version's gameplay, graphic, and animation, only criticizing the computer opponent's low difficulty level. The magazine concluded that the game "is in a league of its own, above all other Atari sports games—simulations included".

In an overview of statistics-oriented baseball games, Computer Gaming World stated that Hardball "would probably be disappointing to anyone other than an avid arcade fan". Compute!'s Apple Applications stated that the Apple II and Macintosh versions had "almost everything you could want from a baseball simulation", with good support for playing as manager, player, or statistician and "exceptionally clear and precise graphics". The magazine concluded that "Hardballs realism is outstanding—at a level unmatched by other baseball software to date". The game was reviewed in 1988 in Dragon #132 by Hartley, Patricia, and Kirk Lesser in "The Role of Computers" column. The reviewers gave the game 5 out of 5 stars. MegaTech gave the genesis version a score of 75% writing: "A decent baseball game which doesn’t have enough novel or interesting features to make it appeal to anyone other then real fans of the sport."

Entertainment Weekly picked the game as the #11 greatest game available in 1991, saying: "With its oversaturated colors, ultrarealistic sound effects (when the umpire shouts 'Play ball!' it sounds as if he’s in the room), and detailed managerial options, HardBall! is the closest you may ever get to playing in a real major-league ballpark."

Legacy
The game appears in the opening scene of the 1987 film The Princess Bride, being played by Fred Savage.

References

External links
 
 HardBall!  (Atari 8-bit) at Atari Mania
 HardBall! (Atari ST) at Atari Mania
 
  (Apple IIGS)

1985 video games
Accolade (company) games
Amiga games
Apple II games
Apple IIGS games
Atari 8-bit family games
Atari ST games
Baseball video games
Commodore 64 games
DOS games
HardBall!
MSX2 games
Multiplayer and single-player video games
Sega Genesis games
U.S. Gold games
Video games developed in the United States
Video games scored by Ed Bogas
ZX Spectrum games